Hiron is a surname. Notable people with the surname include:
Alan Hiron (died 1999), English bridge player and bridge writer, husband of Maureen Hiron
Jacques Hiron (born 1946), French writer
Maureen Hiron (born 1942), English game designer
Ray Hiron (1943–2020), English footballer